Common names: Honduran palm pit viper and March's palm pit viper.

Bothriechis marchi is a species of pitviper, a venomous snake, in the subfamily Crotalinae of the family Viperidae. The species is endemic to Central America. There are no subspecies that are recognized as being valid.

Etymology
The specific name, marchi, is in honor of herpetologist Douglas H. March, who died from the bite of a fer-de-lance in 1939.

Description
March's palm pit viper  is green and relatively slender with a prehensile tail.

Geographic range
Bothriechis marchi is found on the Atlantic versant of northwestern Honduras and eastern Guatemala. It occurs in mesic forest at elevations of  altitude. The type locality given is "the Gold Mines at Quimistan [probably El Oro, Municipio de Quimistán, in the Sierra de Espíritu Santo to the northwest of the town of Quimistán], [Departamento de] Santa Barbara, Honduras Republic".

Reproduction
Bothriechis marchi is viviparous.

References

External links

Further reading
Barbour T, Loveridge A (1929). "On some Hondurian and Guatemalan snakes with the description of a new arboreal pit viper of the genus Bothrops ". Bulletin of the Antivenin Institute of America 3: 1-3. (Bothrops nigroviridis marchi, new subspecies).

marchi
Reptiles described in 1929
Reptiles of Guatemala
Reptiles of Honduras